Mercedes is a Spanish feminine given name, derived from María de las Mercedes ("Our Lady of Mercy" or "Mary of Mercies"), which is one of the Roman Catholic titles of the Virgin Mary. The word "Mercedes" is of Latin origin meaning "mercies" (plural of mercy) from the Latin word merced-, merces, meaning "wages, reward", which in Vulgar Latin acquired the meaning "favor, pity". Hypocoristic forms of the name are Merceditas, Meche and Merche.

Given name
Mercedes, Princess of Asturias (1880–1904), Spanish royal
Mercedes de Acosta (1893–1968), American poet and socialite
Mercedes Bass, American philanthropist
Mercedes Bresso (born 1944), Italian politician
Mercedes Calderón (born 1965), Cuban volleyball player
Mercedes Grabowski (1994–2017), actress
Mercedes Helnwein (born 1979), Austrian artist, writer and filmmaker
Mercedes Indacochea (1889–1959), Peruvian educator
Mercédès Jellinek (1889–1929), the namesake for Mercedes-Benz automobiles
Mercedes Lackey (born 1950), fantasy author
Mercedes Lambre (born 1992), Argentine actress
Mercedes Lander, drummer for Canadian alt-metal band Kittie
Mercedes Lasala (1764 –1837), Argentinian patriot 
Mercedes Leigh (b.1867 – ?), American actress
Mercedes McCambridge (1916–2004), actress
Mercedes Mason (born 1983), Swedish-American actress
Mercedes McNab (born 1980), Canadian-born actress
Mercedes of Orléans (1860–1878), queen consort of Spain
Mercedes Pérez (born 1987), Colombian weightlifter
Mercedes Pérez Merino (born 1960), Spanish trade unionist and politician
Mercedes Peris (born 1985), Spanish backstroke swimmer
Mercedes Ruehl (born 1948), U.S. actress
Mercedes Sahores (born 1974), Argentine ski mountaineer and mountain climber
Mercedes Santamarina (1896–1972), Argentine art collector
Mercedes Sosa (1935–2009), Argentine singer
Mercédesz Stieber (born 1974), Hungarian water polo player
Mercedes Varnado, American professional wrestler known under the ring name Sasha Banks
Mercedes Vostell (born 1933), Spanish writer
Mercedes Yvette Scelba-Shorte (born 1981), fashion model and actress
Mercedes (singer), stage name of R&B and hip-hop singer Raquel Miller

Surname
 Eleoncio Mercedes (1957–1985), boxer
 Denise Mercedes (born 1991), American fashion model
 Yermín Mercedes (born 1993), Dominican baseball player

Fictional characters
Mercédès, in the Alexandre Dumas novel The Count of Monte Cristo
Mercedes, in Jack London's novel The Call of the Wild
Mercedes, in the opera Carmen by Georges Bizet
Mercedes, a princess in the video game "Dragon Blaze"
Mercedes, a character in the film Pan's Labyrinth
Mercedes, one of the five main characters of the video game Odin Sphere
Mercedes "Meche" Colomar, from the video game Grim Fandango
Mercedes Cortez, from the video game Grand Theft Auto: Vice City
Mercedes, the Queen of elves and one of the six Heroes in the MMORPG MapleStory
Mercedes Jones, from the TV series Glee
Mercedes Lane, Heather Graham's character in the 1988 film License to Drive
Mercedes von Martritz from the video games Fire Emblem: Three Houses and Fire Emblem Warriors: Three Hopes
Mercedes McQueen, in the British soap opera Hollyoaks
Mercedes "Mercy" Thompson, protagonist of a novel series by Patricia Briggs

See also
Mercedes (disambiguation)
Marcedes Lewis (born 1984), American football player

Spanish feminine given names
English feminine given names